is a Japanese restaurant and cafe chain headquartered in Shinagawa, Tokyo.

History
Namco bought the Italian Tomato restaurant chain in 1986.  Under Namco control, the store has been featured as a background in the Namco arcade and video console game hits Tekken 3 and Tekken Tag Tournament; the front of the store can be found in Ling Xiaoyu's stage, which is themed like an amusement park. Also, a cameo of this restaurant appeared in the Nintendo Family Computer RPG Rasāru Ishii no Childs Quest. 

Since Namco, now Bandai Namco Games is a significant minority shareholder.

Notes

References

External links
Official website

Namco
Japanese restaurants
Italian restaurants
Restaurants in Japan
Bakery cafés